Haplogroup K2b may refer to:
 Haplogroup K2b (Y-DNA)
 Haplogroup K2b (mtDNA), a relatively rare subclade of Haplogroup K (mtDNA)